The Nokia 1680 classic is a Nokia dual-band GSM mobile phone. It has a VGA camera, speakerphone, multimedia playback, MMS messaging, web browser and e-mail client. Battery talk time is up to 7 hours and 40 minutes. Stand by time is 424 hours. Ringtones are Polyphonic 24 channels.

Internally, it is identical to the Nokia 2630, having the same specifications (such as the camera, operating system and GUI) and has the same pre-installed ringtones, themes and wallpapers.

About
The Nokia 1680 was released in July 2008 (It was one of the T-Mobile company's best-selling phones of 2008, selling 35 million units). Its dimensions are 108 x 46 x 15 mm, and it uses a 2G Network and is activated through a mini-SIM. There is no memory card slot for more storage. However, the phone allows up to 1000 contacts to be stored in its address book, and it has 11 MB of internal storage. The phone was available to be purchased in black, slate gray, wine red, and deep plum.

References

Sources
 

Nokia mobile phones
Mobile phones introduced in 2008